Remelana jangala, the chocolate royal, is a lycaenid or blue butterfly found in South Asia. The species was first described by Thomas Horsfield in 1829.

Subspecies
The subspecies of Remelana jangala which are found in India are:
 Remelana jangala ravata Moore, 1865 – northern chocolate royal
 Remelana jangala andamanica Wood-Mason & de Nicéville, 1881 – powdery chocolate royal

Behavioral patterns
Only short flights of the butterfly can be seen. Male chocolate royal are seen sitting on wet ground and drinking water. They are seldom seen sitting on flowers to suck nectar. However, they are seen sitting on bird faeces and extracting mineral salt. They are usually seen basking in the sun with their upper wings opened.

References

External links
 With images.
Young, J. J. (19 December 2000). "Remelana jangala (Horsfield, 1829) - µÜ¦Ç½º - Chocolate Royal". Hong Kong Lepidopterists Society. "A summary of the life history of Remelana jangala (Lycaenidae: Theclinae) is described and illustrated by colour photographs". Archived 26 July 2011.

Remelanini
Fauna of Pakistan
Butterflies of Singapore